Bobs Creek is a tributary of Dunning Creek in south west/south central Pennsylvania in the United States.

Via Dunning Creek, it is part of the watershed of the Raystown Branch Juniata River, flowing to the Juniata River, the Susquehanna River, and Chesapeake Bay.

Bridges
 The Osterburg Covered Bridge crosses Bobs Creek in East St. Clair Township, Pennsylvania.

See also
List of rivers of Pennsylvania

References

Rivers of Pennsylvania
Tributaries of the Juniata River
Rivers of Bedford County, Pennsylvania